The Forrest H. Dutlinger Natural Area is a protected area in Clinton County, Pennsylvania, United States that includes a  old-growth forest of eastern hemlock, American beech, black cherry, sugar maple, and northern red oak. There are also eastern white pines, but a few were selectively logged around 1900.

The old-growth forest once lay on the boundary of two lumber companies, the Goodyear and Lackawanna, but was apparently spared because of a dispute over a surveying error.

Forrest Dutlinger was a forester for the state of Pennsylvania from 1909 to 1959, beginning his career at a time of massive clear cutting of forests without any reforestation by the timber companies. Major fires were widespread and common due to most machinery being steam driven; the fires used to boil the water would ignite the surrounding area. Dutlinger also watched helplessly as the Asian chestnut blight killed all the American Chestnut trees in a matter of years. The chestnut was the most common hardwood tree in the forest at the time, and its magnificent lumber and nuts as a food source for wildlife have never been replaced.

See also
List of old growth forests

References

Old-growth forests
Protected areas of Clinton County, Pennsylvania